Lina Serhiyivna Herasymenko (born 29 September 1974) is a Ukrainian archer. She competed at the 1996 Summer Olympics in Atlanta, where she placed 23rd in the individual contest, and fifth in the team contest. At those Games she also set the Olympic record in 72 arrow ranking round (673) which lasted until July 23, 2021, when it was beaten in the qualification round by the South Korean archer An San (680).

References

Ukrainian female archers
1974 births
Living people
Archers at the 1996 Summer Olympics
Olympic archers of Ukraine
Sportspeople from Chernivtsi